Uncorked may refer to:

 Uncorked (1998 film) or At Sachem Farm
 Uncorked (2009 film), a Hallmark Channel television film
 Uncorked (2020 film), an American drama film
 Uncorked (album), a 2009 album by Al Stewart